The House Armed Services Subcommittee on Readiness is a subcommittee of the House Armed Services Committee in the United States House of Representatives.

The Chair of the subcommittee is Michael Waltz of Florida and its Ranking Member is Democrat John Garamendi of California.

Jurisdiction

The Readiness Subcommittee exercises oversight and legislative jurisdiction over:

 Military readiness
 Training
 Logistics and maintenance issues and programs
 Military construction
 Military installations
 Family housing issues
 Base Realignment and Closure

Members, 118th Congress

Historical membership rosters

115th Congress

116th Congress

117th Congress

Sources:

See also
 United States Senate Armed Services Subcommittee on Readiness and Management Support

References

External links
House Armed Services Committee 
Subcommittee page

Armed Services Readiness